Kaif Ghaznavi is a Pakistani Performer who has been directing Cultural Festivals with the name of Bunvat International Festival and runs the Kaifwala Foundation. She is better known for her role of Pari in Sang-e-Mar Mar, Feroza in Lamhay and Shabbo in Hum Kahan Ke Sachay Thay. She made her cinematic debut with Sakina Samo's directorial debut, Intezaar.

Filmography

Theatre 
 Chup
 Measure for Measure
Yahudi Ki Ladki
 Bedroom Conversations
Badshahat ka Khatma written by Sadaat Hassan Manto, Directed by Khalid Ahmed

Film

Television

References

External links

Living people
Pakistani television actresses
Year of birth missing (living people)